Thomas Throckmorton may refer to:

Thomas Throckmorton (died 1472), MP for Worcestershire 1447, 1449
Thomas Throckmorton (died 1568), MP for Westbury and Heytesbury
Sir Thomas Throckmorton (Gloucestershire MP), MP for Gloucestershire, 1589
Thomas Throckmorton (died 1615), MP for Warwick and Warwickshire
Thomas Throckmorton (died 1656), officer in the New Model Army executed in 1656
Tom Bentley Throckmorton (1885–1961), American neurologist